is a Japanese manga series written and illustrated by KAITO. It was serialized in Weekly Shōnen Jump before from September 2012 to July 2013. The series was also published in North America in English through Viz Media's digital manga anthology, Weekly Shonen Jump.

Plot
Teenager Sakurai is forced into becoming the manager of the girls' lacrosse team at his school after accidentally touching the chest of his female classmate Toyoguchi. Sakurai is reluctant at first but after witnessing Toyoguchi's extreme determination and hard work, Sakurai tries again to put all of his efforts into something and becomes the manager of the team. While Toyoguchi is thrilled, there are many other members of the team who are not, Sakurai has his work cutout for him as he has to prove his worth to the other girls while also solving current problems that arise for the team.

Characters
 Sakurai - Manager of the Fujioka Lacrosse Club
 Misora Toyoguchi - Captain and an attacker of the Fujioka Lacrosse Club
 Nachi (Nacchin) Saiga - Best friend of Misora and Midfielder on the team
 Rurie Tanaka - Defensive Player
 Junko (Jun) Mizuhashi - Defensive Player
 Shinobu Komatsu - Goalie
 Ichino Noto - Attacking Player
 Aya Sawashiro - Defensive Player
 Yurika Kato - Attacking Player
 Sanari and Unari Yuki - Midfielder Players
 Momiji Kujidera - Defensive Player
 Hana Nozawa -  Defensive Player
 Seki - One of Sakurai's best friends
 Wakamoto - One of Sakurai's best friends
 Sugita - Club Advisor for Fujioka Lacrosse Club
 Chiumi Hayami - Soccer Club manager who has a crush on Sakurai
 Ryuzo Nakahara - "Big Brother" to Misora and son of the owner of Nakahara sports store
 Teruki - Worker at the Nakahara sports store
 Namine Chihara - Best lacrosse player in Japan and on Choran's first string lacrosse team
 Momo Mimori - Midfielder for Choran who aspires to be as good as Namine
 Toka Yamauchi - Captain of Choran's first string lacrosse team and Defender
 Jueri Watanabe - Goalie for Choran who is another prodigy like Namine
 Makoto Yokoyama - Midfielder for Choran
 Karuto Okamura - Defender for Choran
 Ageha Matsui - Attacker for Choran
 Anzu Hikasa - Defender for Choran
 Michiru Omoto - Defender for Choran
 Kazuha Koshimizu - Defender for Choran
 Mahori Sonozaki - Attacker for Choran
 Tsubaki Imai - Attacker for Choran
 Hyoketsu Nakao - Principal of Choran and coach of their lacrosse team

Publication
Cross Manage is written and illustrated by KAITO. It started in Weekly Shōnen Jump on September 15, 2012, and finished on July 16, 2013. A special chapters was published in Jump Next! on October 15, 2013. Shueisha compiled its individual chapters into five tankōbon volumes published between March 4 and November 1, 2013.

In North America, the manga was published by Viz Media and serialized in Weekly Shonen Jump Alpha. The first chapter of the manga was published on October 1, 2012. Viz Media has released all five tankōbon volumes through their digital manga service from May 14, 2013 to March 11, 2014.

Volume list

See also
 Blue Flag — Another manga series by the same author.

References

External links
Official Manga Website 

2012 manga
Ball games in anime and manga
Lacrosse mass media
Romantic comedy anime and manga
School life in anime and manga
Shōnen manga
Shueisha manga
Viz Media manga